Ro-16, originally named Submarine No. 37, was an Imperial Japanese Navy Kaichū-Type submarine of the Kaichū III subclass. She was commissioned in 1922 and operated in the waters of Japan. She was stricken in 1933.

Design and description
They displaced  surfaced and  submerged.

For surface running, the submarines were powered by two  Sulzer Mark II diesel engines, each driving one propeller shaft. When submerged each propeller was driven by a  electric motor. They could reach  on the surface and  underwater.

The submarines were armed with six  torpedo tubes, four internal tubes in the bow and two external tubes mounted on the upper deck, and carried a total of ten Type 44 torpedoes. They were also armed with a single  deck gun mounted aft of the conning tower.

Construction and commissioning

Ro-16 was laid down as Submarine No. 37 on 18 November 1920 by the Kure Naval Arsenal at Kure, Japan. Launched on 22 April 1921, she was completed and commissioned on 29 April 1922.

Service history

Upon commissioning, Submarine No. 37 was attached to the Kure Naval District, to which she remained attached throughout her career. She was assigned to Submarine Division 15 — in which she spent the rest of her career — on 15 May 1922. Submarine Division 15 served in the Kure Defense Division from 1 December 1922 to 1 December 1923. Submarine No. 37 was renamed Ro-16 on 1 November 1924,  and on 1 December 1926 Submarine Division 15 began another assignment to the Kure Defense Division that lasted through the end of Ro-16′s active service.

Ro-16 was stricken from the Navy list on 1 September 1933. In 1934, her hulk was transferred to the Ehime Prefectural Yuge Commercial Ship School, later renamed the Yuge National College of Maritime Technology, at Yuge, Ehime, Japan.

Notes

References
, History of Pacific War Vol.17 I-Gō Submarines, Gakken (Japan), January 1998, 
Rekishi Gunzō, History of Pacific War Extra, "Perfect guide, The submarines of the Imperial Japanese Forces", Gakken (Japan), March 2005, 
The Maru Special, Japanese Naval Vessels No.43 Japanese Submarines III, Ushio Shobō (Japan), September 1980, Book code 68343-44
The Maru Special, Japanese Naval Vessels No.132 Japanese Submarines I "Revised edition", Ushio Shobō (Japan), February 1988, Book code 68344-36
The Maru Special, Japanese Naval Vessels No.133 Japanese Submarines II "Revised edition", Ushio Shobō (Japan), March 1988, Book code 68344-37
The Maru Special, Japanese Naval Vessels No.135 Japanese Submarines IV, Ushio Shobō (Japan), May 1988, Book code 68344-39

Ro-16-class submarines
Kaichū type submarines
Ships built by Kure Naval Arsenal
1921 ships